Adrian Lamont Ross (born February 19, 1975) is a former American football linebacker in the National Football League. He was signed by the Cincinnati Bengals as an undrafted free agent in 1998. He played college football at Colorado State.

1975 births
Living people
Sportspeople from Santa Clara County, California
American football linebackers
Colorado State Rams football players
Cincinnati Bengals players
Players of American football from California